Sarangesa lucidella, commonly known as the lucidella elfin, is a species of butterfly in the family Hesperiidae. It is found in Ethiopia, Sudan, the Democratic Republic of the Congo, and from Kenya to Zambia, Malawi, Zimbabwe and Botswana. The habitat consists of shady banks of culverts.

Adults are on wing from July to October and from January to May.  There are distinct seasonal forms.

Subspecies
Sarangesa lucidella lucidella - Sudan, Democratic Republic of Congo, Kenya to central and eastern Zambia, Malawi, Zimbabwe, Botswana
Sarangesa lucidella helena Evans, 1947 - Ethiopia

References

Butterflies described in 1891
Celaenorrhinini
Butterflies of Africa